The Royal Society of Tropical Medicine and Hygiene, more commonly known by its acronym RSTMH, was founded in 1907 by Sir James Cantlie and George Carmichael Low. Sir Patrick Manson, the Society's first President (1907–1909), was recognised as "the father of tropical medicine" by his biographer. He passed the post on to Sir Ronald Ross (president 1909–1911), discoverer of the role of mosquitoes in the transmission of malaria.

The objectives of RSTMH are "to promote and advance the study, control and prevention of diseases in man and other animals in the tropics and sub-tropics, facilitate discussion and exchange of information among those who are interested in tropical diseases and international health, and generally to promote the work of those interested in these objectives".

In 1920, King George V gave his permission for RSTMH to use the Royal prefix. Queen Elizabeth II is patron of the society and the Princess Royal is an Honorary Fellow.

Location
In 2011 the Society moved from Manson House, 26 Portland Place, London, to its current premises in Northumberland House, 303-306 High Holborn, London, WC1V 7JZ

Journals
RSTMH publishes two peer reviewed journals, Transactions of the Royal Society of Tropical Medicine and Hygiene and International Health.

Awards and medals
RSTMH awards the Chalmers Medal and Donald Mackay Medal annually and the Manson Medal, the George Macdonald Medal and the Sir Rickard Christophers Medal triennially.

Five special Centenary Medals were awarded in 1907, two for lifetime achievement and three for special achievement by an under-45 year old.

Presidents
A complete list of presidents and their inaugural presidential addresses can be found on the Transactions website.

References

External links
 
 

Health in the London Borough of Camden
Medical associations based in the United Kingdom
Organisations based in the London Borough of Camden
Organisations based in London with royal patronage
Organizations established in 1907
1907 establishments in the United Kingdom
Tropical medicine organizations